The name Inez has been used for one tropical cyclone in the Atlantic Ocean and one tropical cyclone in the Western Pacific Ocean. The name Inez was retired in the Atlantic after 1966.

Atlantic:
 Hurricane Inez (1966) – the worst storm of the season. struck Lesser Antilles, Haiti, Cuba, Bahamas, Florida Keys, Yucatán and Mexico.

Western Pacific:
 Typhoon Inez (1947) (T4708) – struck Taiwan and China.

Atlantic hurricane set index articles
Pacific typhoon set index articles